"Almost Here" is a song by Irish singer Brian McFadden and Australian singer Delta Goodrem. Written by McFadden, Paul Barry and Mark Taylor, and produced by Taylor, the song appears on McFadden's debut studio album, Irish Son, and on Goodrem's second studio album, Mistaken Identity. "Almost Here" was released as a single in the United Kingdom on 31 January 2005 and in Australia on 7 March 2005. The duet reached number one in both singers' home countries and charted within the top three in Denmark, Norway, and the United Kingdom.

Composition
The song is considered pop, having an influence of folk music. The song is a duet and it features an antiphon. The recording has an emphasis on the instrumental arranging, which is backed up by a string section. The song is written in the key of A minor and moves at a tempo of 78 beats per minute. It has the sequence of Am–G–Dm7 as its chord progression.

Chart performance
Released in the United Kingdom on 31 January 2005, the song made its first chart appearance in Brian McFadden's native Ireland, where it debuted at number two on 3 February 2005 and peaked at number one the following week. Two days later, the song debuted and peaked at number three on the UK Singles Chart; it would become Delta Goodrem's final UK chart entry. The song also debuted at number three in Denmark, and in its third week, it reached its peak of number two and remained in the top 10 for 12 weeks. On 7 March 2005, "Almost Here" was released in Goodrem's native Australia. On the week of 20 March 2005, it debuted at number one, staying in the top 10 for eight weeks and earning a platinum certification for shipments of more than 70,000.

Music video
In the accompanying music video, McFadden is seen to be chasing after Goodrem through an airport, after she forgets her handbag. There are two alternate endings to the video: the "happy" ending, where McFadden and Goodrem are reunited in the taxi as it drives away from the airport, and the "sad" ending, where McFadden is by himself after the taxi leaves with Goodrem inside. The "sad" ending appears on the DVD The Life of Brian: Six Months in the Life of Brian McFadden, while the "happy" ending appears on the single's physical release.

Track listings
 UK CD 1
 "Almost Here" (Brian McFadden and Delta Goodrem)  – 3:46
 "Hollow No More" (Brian McFadden and Delta Goodrem)  – 4:00

 UK CD 2
 "Almost Here" (Brian McFadden and Delta Goodrem) – 3:46
 "Irish Son" (Brian McFadden, live at The Belfast Empire, 27 November 2004)  – 5:03
 "Real to Me" (Brian McFadden, live at The Belfast Empire, 27 November 2004)  – 4:37
 "Almost Here" (video)

 Australian CD single
 "Almost Here" (Delta Goodrem and Brian McFadden) – 3:46
 "Hollow No More" (Delta Goodrem and Brian McFadden)  - 4:00
 "Turn You Away" (Delta Goodrem)  – 3:38
 "Almost Here" (video)

Credits and personnel
Credits are taken from the Australian CD single liner notes.

Studio
 Recorded and mixed at Metrophonic Studios (Ripley, England)

Personnel

 Brian McFadden – writing, vocals
 Paul Barry – writing
 Mark Taylor – writing, production, mixing
 Delta Goodrem – vocals
 Adam Phillips – guitar

 Mark Smith – bass
 Ash Soon – drums
 Ren Swan – mixing, Pro Tools engineering
 Alex Smith – Metrophonic assistant

Charts

Weekly charts

Year-end charts

Certifications

See also
 List of number-one singles of 2005 (Australia)
 List of number-one singles of 2005 (Ireland)

References

2004 songs
2005 singles
Black-and-white music videos
Brian McFadden songs
Delta Goodrem songs
Irish Singles Chart number-one singles
Male–female vocal duets
Number-one singles in Australia
Song recordings produced by Mark Taylor (record producer)
Songs written by Brian McFadden
Songs written by Mark Taylor (record producer)
Songs written by Paul Barry (songwriter)
Sony Music singles